Eldridge v British Columbia (AG), [1997] 3 SCR 624, is a leading decision by the Supreme Court of Canada that expanded the application of the Canadian Charter of Rights and Freedoms under section 32 of the Charter.

Each of the appellants in this case was born deaf; their preferred means of communication was sign language. They contended that the absence of interpreters impaired their ability to communicate with their doctors and other health care providers, and thus increased the risk of misdiagnosis and ineffective treatment. The Supreme Court of Canada ruled that sign language interpreters must be provided in the delivery of medical services where doing so is necessary to ensure effective communication.

See also
 List of Supreme Court of Canada cases (Lamer Court)

External links
 

Section Fifteen Charter case law
Supreme Court of Canada cases
Canadian Charter of Rights and Freedoms case law
1997 in Canadian case law